José Antonio Estudillo (November 5, 1803 – July 20, 1852) was a Californio ranchero, politician, and soldier, who served as Alcalde of San Diego and as San Diego County Assessor. He was a member of the Estudillo family of California, a prominent Californio family of San Diego.

Life
José Antonio Estudillo was born in 1803 in Monterey, then part of New Spain, to Captain José María Estudillo. José Antonio Estudillo probably came to San Diego as a boy in 1820, when his father became commandant of the Presidio of San Diego. His brother José Joaquín was the second alcalde of Yerba Buena, the pueblo that later became San Francisco.

Estudillo joined the Spanish Army at the Presidio and eventually made lieutenant around 1824. He received the Rancho Janal Mexican land grant in 1829 and Rancho San Jacinto Viejo in 1842. He was a member of the assembly from 1833 to 1835. By the time he reached adulthood, settlement around the fort (presidio) that his father had commanded had grown to become the early pueblo San Diego; Estudillo  "followed" in his father's footsteps when, during 1837–38, he was Alcade and Juez de Paz of San Diego. At various times he was also the treasurer and tax collector.

In 1827 Estudillo built a large L-shaped adobe house for his father on land granted by Governor José María de Echeandía . The adobe was later enlarged and became U-shaped. It was considered one of the finest homes in Alta California. The house is still standing, known as Casa de Estudillo, and is one of the oldest surviving buildings in California. It is located in Old Town San Diego State Historic Park, on the southeast side of the Old Town San Diego plaza, and is designated a National Historic Landmark in its own right. The Estudillo family lived there until 1887, after which the home became a tourist attraction popularly known as "Ramona's Marriage Place," based on the fictional character in Helen Hunt Jackson's novel Ramona. The house was obtained by the State of California in 1968, was restored to its original condition, and is now a museum open to the public.

During the Mexican–American War Estudillo remained neutral. After California became part of the United States in 1850, he was the first San Diego County assessor.

Estudillo married María Victoria Dominguez (July 28, 1800 – October 19, 1875) in the Presidio of San Diego on March 1, 1824.  She was the daughter of María de los Reyes and Sergeant Cristobal Dominguez, grantee of Rancho San Pedro. They had 7 sons and 5 daughters.  Their daughter, María Antonia Estudillo, married Miguel Pedrorena. Their daughters María Francisca Estudillo and later María del Rosario Estudillo married José Antonio Aguirre. Their son José Guadalupe Estudillo was California State Treasurer.

Estudillo died in 1852 and is buried at El Campo Santo Catholic Cemetery in Old Town San Diego. In his biography in Smythe's History of San Diego, he is described as "a man of excellent character and large influence.

References

1803 births
1852 deaths
Californios
Mayors of San Diego
American politicians of Mexican descent
19th-century Mexican politicians
People of Alta California
People of Mexican California
19th-century American politicians